Nakodar (Rural) is a village in Nakodar in Jalandhar district of Punjab State, India. The village is administrated by Sarpanch an elected representative of the village. Nakodar (Rural) is unique among surrounding villages as the geographical area of this village being , is very large for a scattered population of only 481 people.

Demography 
, The village has a total number of 88 houses and the population of 481 of which 236 are males while 245 are females.  According to the report published by Census India in 2011, out of the total population of the village 352 people are from Schedule Caste and the village does not have any Schedule Tribe population so far.

See also
List of villages in India

References

External links 
 Tourism of Punjab
 Census of Punjab

Villages in Jalandhar district
Villages in Nakodar tehsil